River Lwajjali is a river in Uganda, in East Africa.

Location
The Lwajjali River is located in Central Uganda. It starts from the swamp, west of the village of Kisweera, in Mukono District, the Central Region of Uganda. It flows in a northwestern direction at first, then turns north and then northeast to empty into River Sezibwa in  Kayunga District at its border with Luweero District, east of the village of Kiziba. The source of River Lwajjali is located in Kisweera, with coordinates:0°24'50.0"N, 32°45'03.0"E (Latitude:0.413889; Longitude:32.750833). River Lwajjali empties into River Sezibwa in the swamps north of Kayunga, in Kayunga District, with coordinates:0°51'27.0"N, 32°47'29.0"E (Latitude:0.857500; Longitude:32.791389).

Course
Out of its source, the river flows northwest and crosses the Gayaza-Kayunga Road at Nakasajja, where it forms the border between Wakiso District to the west and Mukono District to the east. The river then makes a gradual turn to flow in a northward direction. It continues to curve clockwise, now forming the boundary between Kayunga District to the east and Luweero District to the west.

See also

References

External links
Rivers and Lakes of Uganda

Rivers of Uganda
Wakiso District
Mukono District
Kayunga District
Luweero District